Soda bread is a variety of quick bread traditionally made in a variety of cuisines in which sodium bicarbonate (otherwise known as "baking soda", or in Ireland, "bread soda") is used as a leavening agent instead of the traditional yeast. The ingredients of traditional soda bread are flour, baking soda, salt, and buttermilk. The buttermilk in the dough contains lactic acid, which reacts with the baking soda to form tiny bubbles of carbon dioxide. Other ingredients can be added, such as butter, egg, raisins, or nuts. An advantage of quick breads is their ability to be prepared quickly and reliably, without requiring the time-consuming skilled labor and temperature control needed for traditional yeast breads.

Preparation
Soda bread is made with coarse flour (either white or whole meal), or a mix of the two depending on the recipe. High protein flour is not needed for this bread as the texture is described as being "moist and crumbly". Other whole grains (such as rolled oats) may be added to create different varieties. This bread does not have to be kneaded and bakers caution that kneading can toughen the dough.

Buttermilk or sour milk is traditionally the liquid ingredient due to its reaction with the soda.

Some recipes may add olive oil or eggs, or sweeteners like molasses, sugar, treacle, or honey, but these are not part of the basic recipe.

Origin

Ireland

Traditional Irish bread was historically cooked on a griddle as flatbread because the domestic flours did not have the properties needed to rise effectively when combined with yeast. Baking soda offered an alternative, but its popularity declined for a time when imported high-gluten flours became available. Brown soda bread (served with smoked salmon) reappeared on luxury hotel menus in the 1960s. Modern varieties can be found at Irish cafes and bakeries, some made with Guinness, treacle, walnuts, and herbs, but the sweetened version with caraway and raisins is rarely seen anymore. Soda bread made with raisins is colloquially called "Spotted Dog" or "Spotted Dick".

In Ireland, the flour is typically made from soft wheat, so soda bread is best made with a cake or pastry flour (made from soft wheat), which has lower levels of gluten than a bread flour. In some recipes, the buttermilk is replaced by live yogurt or even stout. Because the leavening action starts immediately (compared to the time taken for yeast bread to rise), bakers recommend the minimum amount of mixing of the ingredients before baking; the dough should not be kneaded.

Various forms of soda bread are popular throughout Ireland. Soda breads are made using wholemeal, white flour, or both. In Ulster, the wholemeal variety is usually known as wheaten bread and is normally sweetened, while the term "soda bread" is restricted to the white savoury form. In the southern provinces of Ireland, the wholemeal variety is usually known as brown bread and is almost identical to the Ulster wheaten. In some parts of Fermanagh, the white flour form of the bread is described as fadge.

The "griddle cakes", "griddle bread" (or soda farls in Ulster) take a more rounded shape and have a cross cut in the top to allow the bread to expand. The griddle cake or farl is a more flattened type of bread. It is cooked on a griddle, allowing it to take a more flat shape, and it is split into four sections. The soda farl is one of the distinguishing elements of the Ulster fry, where it is served alongside potato bread, also in farl form.

Scotland
In Scotland, varieties of soda breads and griddle sodas include bannocks and farls (Scots: , "a fourth"), "soda scones", or "soda farls", using baking powder or baking soda as a leavening agent giving the food a light and airy texture.

Bannocks are flat cakes of barley or oatmeal dough formed into a round or oval shape, then cooked on a griddle. The most authentic versions are unleavened, but from the early 19th century bannocks have been made using baking powder, or a combination of baking soda and buttermilk or clabbered milk. Before the 19th century, bannocks were cooked on a bannock stone, a large, flat, rounded piece of sandstone, placed directly onto a fire, then used as a cooking surface. Several varieties of bannock include Selkirk bannocks, beremeal bannocks, Michaelmas bannock, Yetholm bannock, and Yule bannock.

The traditional soda farl is used in the full Scottish breakfast along with the potato scone.

Serbia

In Serbian tradition, soda bread is prepared by various rules and rituals. A coin is often put into the dough during the kneading; other small objects may also be inserted. At the beginning of Christmas dinner, the česnica is rotated three times counter-clockwise, before being broken among the family members. The person who finds the coin in their piece of the bread will supposedly be exceptionally lucky in the coming year. Before baking, the upper surface of the loaf may be inscribed with various symbols, such as a Christogram, or stars, circles, and impressions of keys or combs.

Australia
Damper is a traditional Australian bread prepared in a similar style to the pan breads found in North American and native Inuit cuisine. First documented in 1827 and prepared by farm-men, damper was a quick and easy way to prepare bread in the Australian bush. The word "damper" derives from the English word "to snack" or to dampen the flour in the fire of one's appetite.

United States of America
During the early years of European settlement of the Americas, settlers used soda or pearl ash, more commonly known as potash (pot ash) or potassium carbonate, as a leavening agent (the forerunner to baking soda) in quick breads. By 1824, The Virginia Housewife by Mary Randolph was published containing a recipe for Soda Cake.

In 1846, two American bakers, John Dwight and Austin Church, established the first factory in the United States to produce baking soda from sodium carbonate and carbon dioxide.

Modern American versions of Irish Soda Bread often include raisins or currants, and caraway seeds.

See also

 Proziaki
 List of breads
 List of Irish dishes
 List of quick breads

References

External links

 Society for the Preservation of Irish Soda Bread
History of and recipes for Irish Soda bread at European Cuisines.com

Quick breads
Irish cuisine
Irish breads
Cuisine of Northern Ireland
Christmas food
Serbian cuisine
Bulgarian cuisine
Scottish breads